The 2017 Moroccan Throne Cup will be the 61st staging of the Moroccan Throne Cup. The winners will be assured a place for the 2018 CAF Confederation Cup preliminary round.

The 2017 Moroccan Throne Cup Final played at the Prince Moulay Abdellah Stadium in Rabat, on 18 November 2017. Raja Casablanca winning their 8th title.

Final phase

Qualified teams
The following teams competed in the 2017 Coupe du Trône.

16 teams of 2016–17 Botola

Chabab Atlas Khénifra
Chabab Rif Hoceima
Difaâ El Jadidi
FAR Rabat
FUS Rabat
Hassania Agadir
IR Tanger
JS de Kasbah Tadla
KAC Kénitra
Kawkab Marrakech
Moghreb Tétouan
Olympic Safi
Olympique Khouribga
Raja Casablanca
RSB Berkane
Wydad Casablanca

8 teams of 2016–17 GNF 2

AS Salé
MC Oujda
Olympique Dcheira
Rapide Oued Zem
Union Sidi Kacem
US Témara
Wydad de Fès
Youssoufia Berrechid

7 teams of 2015–16 GNFA 1

Chabab Houara
Club Salmi
Olympique Marrakech
Olympique Phosboucraa
Renaissance Ezzmamra
Stade Marocain
TAS de Casablanca

1 teams of 2015–16 GNFA 2
Rajaa Sportif d'Arfoud

Bracket

Round of 16

 1/16th finals of the Coupe du Trône First leg: 22-23 August 2017
 1/16th finals of the Coupe du Trône Second leg: 26-27 August 2017

Draw of the Coupe du Trône 2016 - 2017 season

Round of 8

 1/8th finals of the Coupe du Trône First leg: 12-13 September 2017
 1/8th finals of the Coupe du Trône Second leg: 19-20 September 2017

Quarter-finals

 1/4th finals of the Coupe du Trône First leg: 11 October 2017
 1/4th finals of the Coupe du Trône Second leg: 25 October 2017

Semi-finals

 1/2th finals of the Coupe du Trône First leg: 25-26 October 2017
 1/2th finals of the Coupe du Trône Second leg: 1-2 November 2017

Final

See also
2016–17 Botola
2018 CAF Confederation Cup

References

External links
Fédération Royale Marocaine de Football

Morocco
Coupe
Coupe